Dez Stewart (born April 18, 1993) is an American football wide receiver for the San Diego Strike Force of the Indoor Football League (IFL). He was signed by the Tampa Bay Buccaneers as an undrafted free agent after the 2016 NFL Draft. He played college football at Ohio Dominican University.

Professional career

Tampa Bay Buccaneers
On May 2, 2016, Stewart was signed by the Buccaneers as an undrafted free agent. He was waived on May 12, 2016.

Washington Redskins
On July 18, 2016, Stewart was signed by the Washington Redskins. He was waived on August 27, 2016..

Green Bay Packers
On October 24, 2016, Stewart was signed to the Green Bay Packers' practice squad. He was released on December 2, 2016.

Pittsburgh Steelers
On January 24, 2017, Stewart was signed by the Pittsburgh Steelers to a reserve/future contract. He was waived/injured on May 5, 2017 and placed on injured reserve. On May 11, he was waived with an injury settlement.

Detroit Lions
On August 8, 2017, Stewart signed with the Detroit Lions. He was waived/injured on September 1, 2017 and placed on injured reserve. He was released on September 8, 2017.

Albany Empire
On March 4, 2019, Stewart was assigned to the Albany Empire. He was placed on recallable reassignment on April 12, 2019, and became a free agent.

Green Bay Blizzard
On January 27, 2022, Stewart signed with the Green Bay Blizzard of the Indoor Football League (IFL). On October 12, 2022, Stewart was released by the Blizzard.

San Diego Strike Force
On October 19, 2022, Stewart signed with the San Diego Strike Force of the Indoor Football League (IFL).

Personal life
Stewart's cousin Bo Smith, played a few seasons in the NFL and the CFL as a cornerback. Along with progressional sports, Dez is an entrepreneur, owning a digital media business (Unorthodoxs Media, LLC), a clothing line (Humalien Clothing), and a social networking app he built and published (Fonebook App). He also releases music under the pseudonym TuFou XoMu.

References

1993 births
Living people
American football wide receivers
Tampa Bay Buccaneers players
Washington Redskins players
Green Bay Packers players
Pittsburgh Steelers players
Detroit Lions players
Albany Empire (AFL) players
Ohio Dominican Panthers football players
Players of American football from Kentucky
Sportspeople from Owensboro, Kentucky